was a village located in Kamiminochi District, Nagano Prefecture, Japan.

As of 2003, the village had an estimated population of 5,395 and a density of 152.14 persons per km². The total area was 35.46 km².

On October 1, 2005, Samizu, along with the village of Mure (also from Kamiminochi District), was merged to create the town of Iizuna.

Dissolved municipalities of Nagano Prefecture
Iizuna, Nagano